Eleutherodactylus glanduliferoides is a species of frog in the family Eleutherodactylidae. It is endemic to the Massif de la Selle, Haiti. It is a very rare species that may already be extinct. Its natural habitat is tropical moist montane forest at elevations of  asl. It is threatened by habitat loss caused by charcoaling and slash-and-burn agriculture. The known locality is just outside the La Visite National Park (which has no active management for conservation, and sees continuing habitat loss).

References

glanduliferoides
Endemic fauna of Haiti
Amphibians of Haiti
Amphibians described in 1936
Taxa named by Benjamin Shreve
Taxonomy articles created by Polbot